Backusella macrospora is a species of zygote fungus in the order Mucorales. It was described by Andrew S. Urquhart and James K. Douch in 2020. The specific epithet refers to the large size of the sporangiospores. The type locality is Tarra-Bulga National Park, Australia.

See also
 
 Fungi of Australia

References

External links
 

Mucoraceae
Fungi described in 2020